Teodozia Zarivna (born June 22, 1951) is a Ukrainian writer, poet, playwright, journalist, theatre critic, and translator.

Biography
Teodozia Petrivna Zarivna was born in 1951, in the village of Rydoduby in the Ternopil region of Western Ukraine. She is a Ukrainian poet, essayist, novelist, playwright, journalist, translator, literary and theatre critic, writer and host of literary and cultural TV programs.

She graduated from Ivan Franko National University of Lviv (Philology faculty, 1973) and Kyiv National I. K. Karpenko-Kary Theatre, Cinema and Television University (Theatre Studies faculty, 1979).

She worked at Ivan Franko National Academic Drama Theater in Kyiv and at National Public Broadcasting Company of Ukraine (UA:PBC).

Teodozia Zarivna is an author and hostess for many literary series and cultural programs, among them "A Literary Studio", "The Fundamental", "In the Beginning Was the Word", "Not by Only Bread...".

She has taken part in the International Literary Festivals: Bishkek, Kyrgyzstan (2008), Sofia, Bulgaria (2013), Chisinau, Moldova (2014), Poznan, Poland (2016), Brno, Olomouc, Prague, Czech Republic (2016) Vilnius, Lithuania (2017), and also has participated in the International Science Conference in Brno, Czech Republic (2015).

Zarivna has translated from Polish into Ukrainian a theatrical play Requiem for the Mistress by Wieslaw Mysliwski, and also poems of Urszula Koziol, Maria Duszka, Danuta Bartosh, Yuzef Baran, Stanislav Baranchak, Kazimierz Burnat, Carl Grenzler, Pavel Kuszczinsky, Romuald Meczkowsky, Tomasz Jastrun, and others.

Her translation from English into Ukrainian of Arthur Miller's play All My Sons was premiered in July 2017 at the Ivan Franko National Academic Drama Theater in Kyiv.

She is the author of five books of poetry, among them Acting On a Circle (1991), Provincial Thoughts (2009), Out of Ashes and Metal (2011). She has also published four novels including The Hunt For the Sky Birds (2014), which won the Yaroslaviv Val Literary Prize (2015) in Ukraine,  two theatrical plays, and many documentary movie scripts.

Her literary works have been translated into English, German, Portuguese, Macedonian, Polish, Czech, Russian, and Romanian.

Teodozia Zarivna has won a number of literary prizes such as the Vasyl Symonenko Poetry Prize (1992), the Berezil Magazine First Prize (1999 and 2004), the Courier of Kryvbas Magazine Literary Prize (2003 and 2006), the Volodymyr Svidzynskyi Poetry Prize (2010), the Dmytro Nytchenko Prize for popularization of Ukrainian literature (2014), and others.

She currently lives in Kyiv. Since November 2014, Teodozia Zarivna has been the chief editor for the literary magazine Kyiv in Ukraine.

Literary works

Poetry
 Acting on a Circle (1991, Ukraine)
 A Watcher For an Abandoned Paradise (1997, Ukraine)
 The Motherland in the Coat of Arms (2004, Ukraine)
 Provincial Thoughts (2009, Ukraine)
 Out of Ashes and Metal (2011, Ukraine)
 Poesias (2016, Brazil)

Novels
 Stones Growing Among Us (1999)
 A Straw Paradise (2001)
 A Willow Board (2008)
 The Hunt For the Sky Birds (2014)

Short Stories and Novellas
 A Girl Out of a Sweet Cherry  (2003)
 A Lake in the Fog (2006)
 Notes on the Skirt Hem (2010)
 Ascent to Kaiserwald (2017)

Plays
 Confession for Everyone
 Theatre (translation into Ukrainian and playscript based on the novel by Somerset Maugham)
 The North Wind for Don Juan

Documentary Movie Scripts
 Cathedral
 Olzhych's Return
 Two Lives of Iryna Wilde
 The Road of Viacheslav Chornovil
 The Cossacks' Generations Live On... Oleksandr Ilchenko
 Orpheus From Marianivka
 Marko Vovchok, the Fatal Woman 
 The Face of Freedom

Awards

 The Vasyl Symonenko Literary Award for the book of poetry Acting on aCircle, 1992
 A Watcher For an Abandoned Paradise—the best poetic book of the year 1997 by the magazine Word and Time rating
 The Magazine Berezil First Prize for the novel Stones Growing Among Us, 1999
 The Magazine Berezil Second Prize for the novel A Straw Paradise, 2001
 The Magazine Courier of Kryvbas Prize for the novella A Girl Out of a Sweet Cherry, 2003
 The Borys Necherda Literary Prize for the book of poetry The Motherland in the Coat of Arms, 2004 
 The Magazine Berezil First Prize for the novel The Hunt For the Sky Birds, 2004
 The Magazine Berezil Third Prize for the novella A Lake in the Fog, 2006
 The Magazine Courier of Kryvbas Prize for the circle of poems Provincial Thoughts, 2006
 The novel A Willow Board is one of the top-three best books of the year 2008 by the LitAccent rating
 The Volodymyr Svidzynskyi Literary Prize for the book of poetry Provincial Thoughts, 2010.
 The novel The Hunt For the Sky Birds is in the top-ten best books of the year 2014 by The Book Of The Year—2014 rating
 The Dmytro Nytchenko Prize for popularization of Ukrainian literature on television and in mass media, 2014
 The Yaroslaviv Val Literary Prize for the novel The Hunt For the Sky Birds, 2015
 The Panteleimon Kulish Literary Prize for the novel The Hunt For the Sky Birds, 2018.

References

General references

 Сизоненко О. Золотий цвіт кульбаби // ЛУ. 1998, 4 черв.; 
 Мельник В. Франсуаза Саган української літератури // Веч. Київ. 2004, 28 січ.; 
 Базилевський В. Флейта – ім’я жіноче. Визбирування життя // ЛУ. 2004, 2 груд.; 
 Баранов В. Правда прикрас не потребує // Київ. 2008. Ч. 10; 
 M. Nevrlý. Żena vo vojnovej Krutnave // Slovenské pohlágy. 2009. № 3; 
 Голобородько В. Книга про любов і зраду // Літакцент. 2009, 1 лип.
 Барна В. Зарівна Теодозія Петрівна // Тернопільський енциклопедичний словник : у 4 т. / редкол.: Г. Яворський та ін. — Тернопіль : Видавничо-поліграфічний комбінат «Збруч», 2004. — Т. 1 : А — Й. — С. 623. — .
 Ю.Джугастрянська. Право бути прочитаною.
 Є.Баран. Партитура творчої зрілості.
 В.Голобородько. Книга про любов і зраду.
 М.Нестелєєв. Як світ ловив жінку.
 С.Філоненко.Ток-шоу у просторі літератури.
 О.Логвиненко. «Серце летіло першим…».
 Чумак О.В. Опозиція місто / село в романі Теодозії Зарівної “Полювання на птахів небесних”.
 В.Баранов. Правда прикрас не потребує, ж-л” Київ”, №10,2008.
 Р.Гром'як. Роман Теодозії Зарівної..., ж. „Пектораль”, ч.3-4, 2008.
 О.Бойко. Вербовая дощечка над прірвою буття, ж ”Вітчизна”, №1-2, 2009.
 М.Кондратюк. Жанрово-стильові параметри роману Теодозії Зарівної “Каміння, що росте, крізь нас”, ж. „Слово і час”, №12, 2004
 В.Кожелянко. Еміграція з раю, газ.”Час”, 15.5.1998.
 О.Логвиненко. Справжність, газ.„Літературна Україна”, 17.12. 2009.
 В.Мельник. Франсуаза Саган української літератури, газ.”Вечірній Київ”, 28.1.2004.
 Людмила Таран. "Дівчинка з черешні", ж."Слово і час", № 12, 2004.
 Л.Тарнашинська. Втеча...од раю або історія незгвалтованої душі, ж.„Сучасність”, №7-8, 2000.
 І.Яремчук. Жінка з обличчям любові, ж. „Дзвін”, № 4, 2005.
 С.Жила. "Світ сповнений самотності ... Вивчення роману Теодозії Зарівної "Вербовая дощечка", ж. Українська література в загальноосвітній школі, 2013

1951 births
Living people
Ukrainian writers
20th-century Ukrainian poets
Ukrainian journalists
21st-century Ukrainian poets
Ukrainian women poets
20th-century Ukrainian women writers
21st-century Ukrainian women writers
Ukrainian women journalists